KSCQ is a radio station airing a hot adult contemporary format licensed to Silver City, New Mexico, broadcasting on 92.9 MHz FM.  The station is owned by Skywest Media LLC.

References

External links

SCQ